The Efail Fach television relay station is sited on a hill west of the villages of Efail Fach, Cwm Pelenna and Tonmawr. It was originally built in the 1980s as a fill-in relay for UHF analogue colour television serving all of those settlements. It consists of a 15 m self-supporting lattice mast standing on a hill which is itself about 160 m above sea level. The transmissions are beamed to the east towards the Pelenna valley. The Efail Fach transmission station is owned and operated by Arqiva.

The "Transmission Gallery" site claims that the Efail Fach transmitter re-radiates the signal received off-air from Cilfrew television relay station near Neath, itself a repeater of Kilvey Hill at Swansea. However, Efail Fach used the same frequencies as Cilfrew in the analogue TV days, and shares two frequencies with Cilfrew in the digital TV era.

OFCOM claims that the site re-radiates Kilvey Hill directly. Efail Fach does indeed have a clear line-of-sight to Kilvey Hill (which is about 11.6 km away at a bearing of 259.5°).

When it came, the digital switchover process for Efail Fach duplicated the timing at the Kilvey Hill parent station, with the first stage taking place on Wednesday 12 August 2009 and the second stage was completed on Wednesday 9 September 2009, with the Kilvey Hill transmitter-group becoming the first in Wales to complete digital switchover. After the switchover process, analogue channels had ceased broadcasting permanently and the Freeview digital TV services were radiated at an ERP of 2 W each.

Channels listed by frequency

Analogue television

1980s - 12 August 2009
Efail Fach (being in Wales) transmitted the S4C variant of Channel 4.

Analogue and digital television

12 August 2009 - 9 September 2009
The UK's digital switchover commenced at Kilvey Hill (and therefore at Efail Fach and all its other relays) on 12 August 2009. Analogue BBC Two Wales on channel 45 was first to close, and ITV1 Wales was moved from channel 49 to channel 45 for its last month of service. Channel 49 was replaced by the new digital BBC A mux which started up in 64-QAM and at full power (i.e. 2 W).

Digital television

9 September 2009 - present
The remaining analogue TV services were closed down and the digital multiplexes took over on the original analogue channels' frequencies.

13 March 2013
As a side-effect of frequency-changes elsewhere in the region to do with clearance of the 800 MHz band for 4G mobile phone use, Efail Fach's "BBC B" multiplex will have to be moved from channel 49 to channel 39.

References

External links
The Transmission Gallery: Efail Fach

Transmitter sites in Wales
Wenvoe UHF 625-line Transmitter Group